The Rooftop Garden Project is an experimental urban gardening project in Montreal, Canada.

History
The Montreal-based group Alternatives first introduced the concept of soil-less method planting in 2001. Peggy Bradley, an American developing soil-less techniques in an effort to offer low cost, ecologically sustainable and low-tech gardening solutions for poor, rural communities in places like Brazil, Morocco and India caught the attention of Alternative representatives while observing the work and efforts by the Institute for Simplified Hydroponics in Tehuacan, Mexico.

In 2001, the Institute for Simplified Hydroponics brought their initiatives to Montreal.

In 2001, Jane Rabinowicz of Santropol Roulant and Ishmael Hautecoeur of Alternatives collaborated; Santropole Roulant provided local community ties and Alternatives's knowledge and resources, they created what is now known as the Rooftop Garden Project. They created a demonstration garden of 500m2 on a rooftop located near Burnside Hall on McGill University campus and by 2006, Roulant managed to produce one third (or one tonne) of the food used for the program by growing their own produce.

With the aim of promoting green local produce growing in the Montreal area, the Project has continually created community gardens in social-housing complexes, at schools and seniors' residences, and on rooftops, balconies and stairwells. The Project also leads an education initiative on the sustainability and affordability of autonomous food production, by visiting schools and offering interactive programs for students from elementary  schools to universities. The Project encourages local businesses, building owners, educational institutions, government and borough run organizations and the Montreal citizens at large to begin growing produce. The Project also offers ready-made home grow kits so anybody who wants to can grow produce.

Soil-less cultivation process
The soil-less cultivation process uses self watering containers that are portable and adaptable for any area. The containers are constructed by recycled materials and are simple to build. In 2002, Alternatives converted a 50-gallon olive barrel into a rooftop container. Other recycled items like tires, storage bins and many other day to day items that hold water without leaking can be used. The recycled material is then lined with material such as saw dust or vermiculite to help absorb nutrients and moisture. Organic compost from vegetables, coffee grounds and even paper are used to offer nutrients to the planted items. The containers are watered by rain, either by direct rainfall or simple irrigation systems set up using tubing leading directly into the container.  The roots stay moist but need to be periodically aired out to prevent ruined crops. Produce like cucumbers, tomatoes, cherries, basil, flowers, lettuce and other leafy crops thrive in these environments and take little space to grow.

Garden organisation
The initial demonstration garden is run by volunteers and staff. The Project initiative has led to autonomous gardens run by enterprises and locals, with personal gardens and collective ones. In Montreal, personal soil-less garden containers can be seen hanging from drain pipes, swirling staircases and any other area outdoors.

The Project's first system based on hydroponics was reviewed and modified. The new semi-hydroponic system ditched the chemical output from the simpler system and replaced it with a self-watering system which uses compost as nutrients and soil as irrigation. This system is cleaner, inexpensive and more organic.

Volunteering and funding
The initial volunteers were young adults and students, which led to high turnover rates. Since Rooftop Garden Project's initial launch in 2001, their volunteer base has become more concrete. This has facilitated its relationships with external partners. Several Montreal universities have contributed to the project. Concordia University in the centre of downtown Montreal has run a recent project at its greenhouse.

The majority of the Rooftop Garden Project funding is provided by Alternatives. McGill University, UQAM, TelUQ and the Engineers Without Borders volunteer groups have all provided funding and volunteers to the Project.	
Santropol Roulant is itself a volunteer and donation run organization and does not have resources to fund and expand the Project. The Project also relies heavily on donations and fundraising from the local community members and organizations like Action Comuniterre’s collective garden in the NDG borough of Montreal. To help raise funds for the Project, Comuniterre sells organic heritage seeds and plants to individuals with their own gardens and a portion of the produce grown is sold to local markets.

References

Sources
Beaudin, Monique. “Urban gardening is looking up; Rooftop plots are just one way to 'green' city spaces.” The Montreal Gazette, February 9, 2009. Accessed on April 19, 2010.  

Canadian Partnerships; Special Initiatives Programme. Urban Agriculture Reaches New Heights through Rooftop Gardening. Accessed on March 3, 2010. 

Granger, Lia. “Urban Gardening: the greenhouse effect.” The Montreal Gazette, April 9. 2010. Accessed on April 19, 2010. 

International Partnership in Community Economic Development: The Rooftop Garden Project. Accessed on 	March 3, 2010.  

The Rooftop Gardens Project. Accessed on March 3, 2010. 

Non-profit organizations based in Montreal